The 2015–16 Detroit Red Wings season was the 90th season for the National Hockey League (NHL) franchise that was established on September 25, 1926. The regular season began on October 9, 2015, against the Toronto Maple Leafs, and former Red Wings head coach Mike Babcock, with a 4–0 victory. This season also involved the Red Wings extending their playoff streak to 25 straight seasons.

Off-season
On June 9, 2015, Jeff Blashill was named the head coach of the Red Wings, following the departure of Mike Babcock to the Toronto Maple Leafs.

On June 23, 2015, the Red Wings finalized their coaching staff, Tony Granato will return as an assistant coach, along with Pat Ferschweiler, who was an assistant coach under Blashill with the Grand Rapids Griffins. Dave Noel-Bernier was named video coach, and Chris Chelios will evaluate in-game player performance, and will continue to play a role in player development, by working on-ice with the team's defensemen during practices. Jim Bedard will return for his 19th season with the organization as goaltending coach.

Standings

Schedule and results

Pre-season

Regular season

Playoffs

Player statistics

Skaters

Goaltenders

Goaltenders

†Denotes player spent time with another team before joining the Red Wings. Stats reflect time with the Red Wings only.
‡Traded mid-season
Bold/italics denotes franchise record

Player suspensions/fines

Awards and honours

Awards

Milestones

Transactions
The Red Wings have been involved in the following transactions during the 2015–16 season:

Trades 

Notes
Detroit to retain 15% ($720,000) of salary as part of trade.

Free agents acquired

Free agents lost 

|-

Lost via waivers

Player signings

Draft picks

The Detroit Red Wings' picks at the 2015 NHL Entry Draft, held on June 26–27, 2015 at the BB&T Center in Sunrise, Florida.

Draft notes

 The Detroit Red Wings' second-round pick went to the Dallas Stars as the result of a trade on March 1, 2015, that sent Erik Cole and a conditional third-round pick in 2015 to Detroit in exchange for Mattias Janmark, Mattias Backman and this pick.
 The Dallas Stars' third-round pick went to the Detroit Red Wings as the result of a trade on  March 1, 2015, that sent Mattias Janmark, Mattias Backman, and a second-round pick in 2015 to Dallas in exchange for Erik Cole and this pick (being conditional at the time of the trade). The condition – Detroit will receive a third-round pick in 2015 if they do not qualify for the 2015 Eastern Conference Final and Cole does not play in 50% of Detroit's playoff games – was converted on April 8, 2015, when Cole  was injured for the remainder of the season.
 The Detroit Red Wings' third-round pick went to the Anaheim Ducks as the result of a trade on March 2, 2015, that sent Rene Bourque, William Karlsson and a second-round pick in 2015 to Columbus in exchange for James Wisniewski and this pick.
Columbus previously acquired this pick as the result of a trade on June 28, 2014, that sent Edmonton's third-round pick in 2014 to Detroit in exchange for a third-round pick in 2014 and this pick.

References

Detroit Red Wings seasons
Detroit Red Wings season, 2015-16
Detroit Red
Detroit Red